Xiang or Hsiang may refer to:

Xiang (place), the site of Hong Xiuquan's destruction of a Chinese idol early in the Taiping Rebellion
Xiang (surname), three unrelated surnames: Chinese: 項 and Chinese: 向 (both Xiàng) and Chinese: 相 (Xiāng)
Xiang Chinese, a group of Chinese varieties spoken in Hunan
Xiang Island (simplified Chinese: 响沙; traditional Chinese: 響沙; pinyin: Xiǎngshā), a former island in the Yangtze estuary now forming part of Chongming Island in Shanghai
Xiang River, river in South China
Hunan, abbreviated in Chinese as 湘 (Xiāng), a province of China
Xiang, capital of the Shang dynasty during the reign of He Dan Jia

People with the name

Xiang
Half-brother of legendary Chinese leader Emperor Shun
Xiang of Xia (3rd millennium BC), fifth ruler of the semi-legendary Xia dynasty
Duke Xiang of Song (died 637 BC), a ruler of Sòng in the Spring and Autumn period
Duke Xiang of Jin (died 621 BC), a ruler of Jin
King Xiang of Zhou (died 619 BC), king of the Zhou dynasty
Liu Xiang (disambiguation)

Hsiang
 Mina Hsiang (born 1981), administrator of the United States Digital Service
 Solomon Hsiang, scientist and economist
 Wu-Chung Hsiang (born 1935), Chinese-American mathematician
  (born 1937), Chinese-American mathematician; see Kepler conjecture

See also
Xiang Army raised in Hunan by Zeng Guofan during the Qing dynasty
Townships of the People's Republic of China and Taiwan (simplified Chinese: 乡; traditional Chinese: 鄉; pinyin: xiāng)